Trepidation Glacier is a small glacier entering the east side of Skelton Glacier between Moraine Bluff and Red Dike Bluff: The name was applied by the New Zealand party of the Commonwealth Trans-Antarctic Expedition (1956–58) and refers to a 1957 attempt by an aircraft to land on the exceedingly broken ice at the foot of the glacier.

Glaciers of Hillary Coast